The Trampoline and Tumbling Gymnastics World Championships are the world championships for trampoline gymnastics including Double mini trampoline and Tumbling (gymnastics). They were originally held annually from 1964–1968. The frequency was switched to biennially from 1970–1998. The admission of trampolining to the Olympic Games required a switch to holding the World Championship as a qualifier in the year before the Olympics from 1999.

Championships

Senior

All-time medal table
Updated after the 2022 Trampoline Gymnastics World Championships.

Men's events

Women's events

Mixed events

Overall

Notes
 The official report of the 1965 Trampoline World Championships lists bronze medalist in men's tumbling Peter Davies as an athlete representing Wales (WAL). Similarly, official reports credit 2 silver and 3 bronze medals earned at the 1964 and 1965 editions as a medals for England, instead of Great Britain. However, the official records from the International Gymnastics Federation (FIG) state that Davies represented Great Britain (GBR). Also, these records indicate that medals once credited to England are officially considered to be awarded to Great Britain. Keeping up with the official records by FIG, the medals are credited to Great Britain instead of Wales or England.  
 Official documents from the FIG credit a silver medal earned by Geoff Fog and Alistair McCann in the men's synchro event at the 1982 edition as a medal for Scotland, instead of Great Britain.
 At the 2021 Trampoline World Championships in Baku, Azerbaijan, in accordance with a ban by the World Anti-Doping Agency (WADA) and a decision by the Court of Arbitration for Sport (CAS), athletes from Russia were not permitted to use the Russian name, flag, or anthem. They instead participated under name and flag of the RGF (Russian Gymnastics Federation).

Multiple gold medalists

Boldface denotes active trampoline gymnasts and highest medal count among all trampoline gymnasts (including these who not included in these tables) per type.

Men

All events

Individual events

Women

All events

Individual events

See also
Junior World Gymnastics Championships
 Gymnastics at the Summer Olympics
 Gymnastics at the Youth Olympic Games
 Gymnastics World Championships
 List of gymnastics competitions
 Major achievements in gymnastics by nation

References

External links
 Gymnastics International Federation

 
Trampoline competitions
Recurring sporting events established in 1964